The 1998 European Canoe Slalom Championships took place in Roudnice nad Labem, Czech Republic from 18 to 23 August 1998 under the auspices of the European Canoe Association (ECA). It was the 2nd edition.

Medal summary

Men's results

Canoe

Kayak

Women's results

Kayak

Medal table

References

External links
European Canoe Association

European Canoe Slalom Championships
European Canoe Slalom Championships
European Canoe Slalom Championships
Litoměřice District
Canoeing and kayaking competitions in the Czech Republic